Soaw is a town in the Soaw Department of Boulkiemdé Province in central western Burkina Faso. It is the capital of the Soaw Department and has a population of 5,908.

References

Populated places in Boulkiemdé Province